The Curators of Dixon School is a 2012 documentary directed, co-produced, and written by Pamela Sherrod Anderson about the art collection at Arthur Dixon Elementary School in Chatham, Chicago.

The documentary highlights the school's over 200-piece art collection, which has African-American themes. The film also discusses former principal Joan Dameron Crisler, who established the program. The end credits discuss the impact of budget cuts from the Chicago Public Schools on the art program.

Anderson stated that the impetus to make the documentary began when, at a dinner party, an author of a book about African-American art suggested that she visit the school.

It was screened at the Gene Siskel Film Center in Chicago on November 29, 2012.

Halie Sekoff of the Huffington Post stated "The film is sure to spark a dialogue about the place of “Dixon-models” in the United States, a conversation Anderson and her co-producers are eager to ignite."

References

External links
 The Curators of Dixon School

2012 films
2012 documentary films
Documentary films about African Americans
American documentary films
Films set in Chicago
Documentary films about education in the United States
Documentary films about the visual arts
Chicago Public Schools
2010s American films